Mesosa chassoti is a species of beetle in the family Cerambycidae. It was described by Stephan von Breuning in 1970. It is known from Taiwan.

References

chassoti
Beetles described in 1970